Gaspard Musabyimana (Nyamugali, Ruhengeri, March 12, 1955) is a Rwandan writer who currently lives in Belgium. He has had a multidisciplinary education.

Publications 
 Les années fatidiques pour le Rwanda. Coup d'œil sur les préparatifs intensifs de la « guerre d'octobre », 1986-1990, (Kigali, 1993)
 Sexualité, rites et mœurs sexuels de l'ancien Rwanda. Une facette de la culture rwandaise (Brussels 1999)
 La vraie nature du FPR. D'Ouganda en Rwanda (L'Harmattan, 2003)
 Sprookjes uit afrikaanse savanne (Brussels, Hujmos vzw, 2003). With some friends
 L'APR et les réfugiés rwandais au Zaïre 1996-1997. Un génocide nié (L'Harmattan, 2004)
 Pratiques et rites sexuels au Rwanda (L'Harmattan, 2006).
 Rwanda : le mythe des mots (L'Harmattan, 2008)
 Rwanda, le triomphe de la criminalité politique (L'Harmattan, 2009)
 Dictionnaire de l'histoire politique du Rwanda (Éditions Scribe, 2011).
  Rwanda. Vingt ans de pouvoir du FPR. Quel bilan? (Editions Scribe 2014) with Emmanuel Neretse.

References

External links 
  www.musabyimana.net

Rwandan writers
Rwandan expatriates in Belgium
Living people
1956 births